Harrison Township is one of twelve townships in Harrison County, Indiana, United States. As of the 2010 census, its population was 12,484 and it contained 5,282 housing units. Corydon, the county seat of Harrison County, is in Harrison Township.

History
The township, like the county, is named for governor, general and ninth President William Henry Harrison. The majority of land in the township was in his possession in the first decade of the 19th century. He donated a parcel of land for the construction of Corydon and sold much of the rest of his land in the township by 1815 to the settlers who were rapidly occupying the countryside.

Corydon Battle Site was added to the National Register of Historic Places in 1979.

Geography
The streams of Blue River, Brush Heap Creek, Buck Creek, Hickman Branch, Little Indian Creek, Potato Run and Rock Creek run through this township.

Cities and towns
 Corydon (the county seat)

Unincorporated towns
 Dixie
 Harrison Grange
 Hillcrest
 Idlewild (historical)
 Kings Store
 White Cloud
(This list is based on USGS data and may include former settlements.)

Adjacent townships
 Jackson Township (northeast)
 Franklin Township (east)
 Boone Township (southeast)
 Webster Township (southeast)
 Heth Township (south)
 Washington Township (southwest)
 Jennings Township, Crawford County (west)
 Ohio Township, Crawford County (west)
 Spencer Township (northwest)

Cemeteries
The township contains seven cemeteries: Cedar Hill, Conrad, Hillgrove, Jackson, Jordan, Sharp, Shuck and Trout.

Major highways
 Interstate 64
 Indiana State Road 62
 Indiana State Road 135
 Indiana State Road 337

References
 
 United States Census Bureau cartographic boundary files

External links
 Indiana Township Association
 United Township Association of Indiana

Townships in Harrison County, Indiana
Townships in Indiana